Harold Albert Broda (July 27, 1905 – February 13, 1989) was an American football player.  He played at the end position in the National Football League for the 1927 Cleveland Bulldogs. He also played college football at Brown University, where he was selected by the Associated Press as a second-team player, and by Central Press Association and New York Sun as a first-team selection, on the 1926 College Football All-America Team.

References

1905 births
1989 deaths
All-American college football players
American football ends
Brown Bears football players
Cleveland Bulldogs players
Players of American football from Canton, Ohio